Cursetjee is a surname. Notable people with the surname include:

 Ardaseer Cursetjee (1808–1877), Indian shipbuilder
 Manockjee Cursetjee (1808–1887), Parsi businessman and judge